is a Japanese voice actress from Saitama Prefecture, Japan. She was originally represented by the Early Wing agency, but is now currently affiliated with Haikyō.

Voice roles

Anime
2012
From the New World
2013
Aiura, Ayuko Uehara
Little Busters!, child
Log Horizon, Minori, Mischa
2014
Fairy Tail, Cosmos
Nandaka Velonica, Moe
Space Dandy, child
Log Horizon 2, Minori
World Trigger, Chika Amatori
2015
Urawa no Usagi-chan, Misono Mimuro 
2016
Case Closed, Announcement
Digimon Universe: Appli Monsters, Musimon
Heybot!, Nejiru Nejiiru
2017
18if, Kayo Sugisaki
2018
Hugtto! PreCure, Emiru Aisaki / Cure Macherie
2021
World Trigger 2nd Season, Chika Amatori
Log Horizon: Destruction of the Round Table, Minori
World Trigger 3rd Season, Chika Amatori
2022
Musasino! as Misono Mimuro

Film
Precure Super Stars, Emiru Aisaki / Cure Macherie
Hugtto! PreCure Futari wa Pretty Cure: All Stars Memories, Emiru Aisaki / Cure Macherie
Precure Miracle Universe, Emiru Aisaki / Cure Macherie
Precure Miracle Leap: Minna na Fushigi 1 Nichi, Emiru Aisaki / Cure Macherie

Video games
2011
Disgaea 4: A Promise Unforgotten, Mothman
2012
Girl Friend Beta, Rui Takasaki
2013
Aiura: Shinkei Suijaku de Shōbu da!, Ayuko Uehara
Arcana Famiglia Collezione, Spartaco
The Idolmaster: Million Live, Hinata Kinoshita
2014
Chain Chronicle, Minori
Genkai Totsuki Moero Chronicle, Matango, Chimaera
Shanago Collection, Vezel
Uchi no Hime-sama ga Ichiban Kawaii, Pikari Golgotto
2015
Chaos Dragon: Konton Sensō, Kuihua
Diss World, Yale
Dogma Tsurugi: overture, Riruka
Kisei no Rebellion, Jean D'Arc; Arthur
Mezamashi Festival ~Yumekui to Mezamashi-ya~
Langrisser Reincarnation -Tensei-, Tsubame Deura
World Trigger: Borderless Mission, Chika Amatori
2016
Mahōtsukai to Kuroneko no Wiz, Eliana Gross
World Trigger: Smash Borders, Chika Amatori

References

External links
 Agency profile 
 Official blog 
 

Living people
Japanese voice actresses
Voice actresses from Saitama Prefecture
Year of birth missing (living people)
21st-century Japanese actresses
21st-century Japanese women singers
21st-century Japanese singers
Tokyo Actor's Consumer's Cooperative Society voice actors